Johnny Berger (August 27, 1901 – May 7, 1979) was a Major League Baseball catcher. He played with the Philadelphia Athletics in 1922 and the Washington Senators in 1927.

External links
Baseball-Reference

1901 births
1979 deaths
Philadelphia Athletics players
Washington Senators (1901–1960) players
Baseball players from Louisiana
Suffolk Tigers players